Etymology
super- + potent

Adjective
superpotent (comparative more superpotent, superlative most superpotent)

Highly potent.